Teoman Kumbaracıbaşı (born 18 October 1971) is an Argentine-Turkish actor. He has appeared in more than twenty films since 2004.

Selected filmography

References

External links 

1971 births
Living people
Turkish male film actors
Argentine male film actors
Argentine people of Turkish descent
Turkish people of Argentine descent